Radion is a Slavic masculine given name of Greek origin. Notable people with the name include:

Radion Gataullin (born 1965), Soviet and Russian pole vaulter
Radion Kertanti (born 1971), Slovak wrestler

See also
Rodion
Herodion

Slavic masculine given names